Primislaus or Premislaus can refer to various persons named:
Přemysl
Przemysł (name)